An AK-47 is a Soviet assault rifle.

AK-47 may also refer to:

People

Nickname
 Andrei Kirilenko (born 1981), Russian-American professional basketball player
 Aboubakar Kamara (born 1995), Mauritanian footballer
 Sandile Ndlovu (born 1980), South African football striker

Stage name
 Ak47 (rapper), Swiss rapper Alex Keonig (born 1988)
 AK 47 Mayanja or just AK 47, Ugandan dancehall artist Emmanuel Mayanja (1990–2015)

Films and television
 A. K. 47 (1999 film), a Kannada language Indian movie
 AK-47 (2020 film), a Russian film

Other uses
 AK-47 (cannabis), a strain of cannabis
 USS Aquila (AK-47), a World War II cargo ship
 AK-47, a 2009 song by Mack Maine (feat. Lil Wayne)

See also
 
 
 
 
 
 
 AK-74, variant of the AK-47